The 1992–93 Santosh Trophy was the 49th edition of the Santosh Trophy, the main State competition for football in India. Kerala retained the title defeating Maharashtra 2-0 in the final at the Maharaja's College Ground in Kochi.

Quarter-final

Group A

Group B

Semifinal

Final

References

External links 

Santosh Trophy seasons
1992–93 in Indian football